Shilikchey is a village in Kargil district of the Union territory of Ladakh in India. It is located 5 km away from the Kargil Town, on the right bank of the Suru River. According to 2009 stats, Shelikchey is the gram panchayat of Shilikchey village.

The total geographical area in which this village is expanded is 60.3 hectares. Shilikchey has a total population of 1,006 people. There are about 134 families residing in Shilikchey village. Kargil is the nearest town to Shilikchey which is nearly 5 km away.

Notes

References

 Sources
 

Villages in Kargil district